The 2021–22 season was the 130th season in the existence of SK Slavia Prague and the club's 29th consecutive season in the top flight of Czech football. Domestically, Slavia finished the season 2nd in the league and reached the quarterfinal's of the Czech Cup. In Europe, Slavia where knocked out of the Champions League at the Third qualifying round stage by Ferencváros, the Play-off round of the UEFA Europa League by Legia Warsaw and reached the quarterfinal of the UEFA Europa Conference League where they were defeated by Feyenoord.

Season events

Transfers

Squad

Out on loan

Transfers

In

Loans in

Out

Loans out

Released

Friendlies

Competitions

Overall record

Czech First League

Regular season

League table

Results summary

Results by round

Results

Championship group

League table

Results summary

Results by round

Results

Czech Cup

UEFA Champions League

Qualifying rounds

The draw for the third qualifying round was held on 19 July 2021.

UEFA Europa League

Qualifying rounds

The draw for the play-off round was held on 2 August 2021.

UEFA Europa Conference League

Group stage

Knockout phase

The draw for the knockout round play-offs was held on 13 December 2021.

The round of 16 draw was held on 25 February 2022.

The draw for the quarter-finals was held on 18 March 2022.

Squad statistics

Appearances and goals

|-
|colspan="16"|Slavia Prague B Players:

|-
|colspan="16"|Players away from Slavia Prague on loan:

|-
|colspan="16"|Players who left Slavia Prague during the season:

|}

Goal scorers

Clean sheets

Disciplinary record

References

External links
Official website

Slavia Prague
SK Slavia Prague seasons
Czech Republic football clubs 2021–22 season